Rossmann, Roßmann or Rossman may refer to:

Surname
 Amy Y. Rossman (born 1946), American mycologist
 Benjamin Rossman (born 1980), American-Canadian mathematician
 Bubby Rossman (born 1992), American Major League Baseball player
 Claude Rossman (1881–1928), American Major League Baseball player
 Dirk Rossmann (born 1946), German billionaire businessman and founder of Rossmann
 Douglas A. Rossman (1936–2015), U.S. herpetologist
 Edmund Roßmann (1918–2005), German fighter pilot during World War II
 Ernst Dieter Rossmann (born 1951), German politician
 George Rossman (1885–1967), American lawyer and judge
 George R. Rossman (born 1944), American mineralogist and professor
 Henryk Rossman (1896–1937), Polish lawyer and political activist 
 Karl Roßmann (1916–2002), German officer in the Luftwaffe during World War II  
 Louis Rossmann (born 1988), American right to repair activist
 Michael Rossmann (1930–2019), German-American physicist
 Mike Rossman (born 1955), American former world champion boxer
 Phillip Rossman (1836–1891), American politician
 Sydney Rossman (born 1995), American professional ice hockey player; see 3rd NWHL All-Star Game

Places
 Mount Rossman, Antarctica
 Rossman-Prospect Avenue Historic District, Hudson, New York, USA

Science and technology
 Rossmann fold, a protein structural motif found in proteins 
 Rossmann (supercomputer)

Other uses
 Rossmann (company)

See also 
 Rosman (disambiguation)
 Rozman, a surname

German-language surnames